Cheyne Capital is a London-based alternative asset manager. The firm launched its first fund in 2000 and today specializes in real estate debt, social property impact, corporate credit, convertible bonds, event driven investing and equities.

The Cheyne group currently employs approximately 160 people in its ten offices world-wide.

The firm's co-founder, Stuart Fiertz, was a member of the 14-person Hedge Fund Working Group, which devised best practice policies regarding financial valuation, transparency, and risk management. Those guidelines evolved into what is now the Hedge Fund Standards Board, a self-regulatory body of which Cheyne is a member. It is also a member of the Alternative Investment Management Association (AIMA)., the global representative of the alternative investment industry.  In April 2014, Stuart Fiertz was appointed as a Director of the AIMA Global Council  and is Chair of AIMA’s Alternative Credit Council, a committee of alternative asset management firms which are financing the real economy.

History
Cheyne Capital was founded in 1999 by Jonathan Lourie and Stuart Fiertz who are currently the CEO and President of Cheyne Capital Management (UK) LLP respectively.  At its launch it was authorised and regulated by the U.K. Financial Services Authority (FSA).

References

Hedge fund firms in the United Kingdom
1999 establishments in England
Financial services companies established in 1999
Companies based in the City of Westminster